Josef Ospelt (9 January 1881 – 1 June 1962) was the first Prime Minister of Liechtenstein from 2 March 1921 to 27 April 1922.

Early life 

Josef Ospelt, the son of Julius and Mary Caesar (née Seger), was born in Vaduz, Liechtenstein on 9 January 1881. After attending a country school in Vaduz, he began working as Regierungskanzlist provincial administrator under Carl von In der Maur.

Political career 

In 1918, Ospelt joined the founders of the Progressive Citizens' Party and was later elected chairman and longtime manager of the newspaper Liechtenstein Volksblatt.

On 23 March 1921, he succeeded provincial administrator, Dr. Joseph Peer and participated in the preparation of a new constitution. After the new Constitution of 5 October 1921 took effect, he was appointed head of the government, on the recommendation of Parliament. In this transitional period he was Liechtenstein's last provincial administrator as well as the first head of government as prime minister.

After his resignation as Prime Minister on 27 April 1922, he moved with his family to Vienna. From 1918 to 1922, he served as treasurer and the royal domain administration. After 1922, he established a legal and insurance agency in Vaduz. In 1925 he was a representative of Zurich Insurance. After the renewed political upheaval in 1928, Ospelt held several important public offices. He was among the founding members of the Historical Society in Liechtenstein, which he headed from 1928-1955 as chairman and for many years on the Board of the Vintners of Vaduz. From 1930 to 1932 he was elected to the Landtag of Liechtenstein.

References

1962 deaths
1881 births
Heads of government of Liechtenstein
People from Vaduz
Members of the Landtag of Liechtenstein
Progressive Citizens' Party politicians